Noridian Mutual Insurance Company is an insurer headquartered in Fargo, North Dakota, United States.  It offers health, dental, and life insurance, under several brands, including Blue Cross Blue Shield of North Dakota, which is the largest health insurance provider in the state of North Dakota, with a 96% market share in 2012.

It owns Noridian Healthcare Solutions 2017 LLC, a large electronic data interchange (EDI) contractor to Medicare.

References

External links
Noridian Mutual Insurance Company site
Blue Cross Blue Shield of North Dakota site
Health Insurance

Health insurance companies of the United States
Life insurance companies of the United States
Members of Blue Cross Blue Shield Association
Mutual insurance companies of the United States
Health care companies based in North Dakota